Gervin Miyamoto is the 19th and retired (Nov 2017) United States Marshal for the District of Hawaii. As the United States Marshal, he leads an office of Deputy US Marshals charged with enforcing laws and protecting the United States Federal District Court of Hawaii.

Law Enforcement Career
Miyamoto joined the Honolulu Police Department in 1971. He served in a number of different elite units including Criminal Intelligence, Vice-Narcotics, and SWAT. Miyamoto also joined the Hawaii National Guard around the same time as he joined HPD, and has served continuously for the past 30+ years. His final assignment with HPD was as a lieutenant and special assistant to the Chief of Police (from 1993-1995). For the next four years (from 1995-1999), he served full-time with the Guard was as the Counterdrug Coordinator for the Adjutant General (from 1995-1999). Then, from 1999 to 2010, he served as the Law Enforcement Liaison for the United States Attorney for the District of Hawaii. In 2010, he was appointed by President Barack Obama to become the United States Marshal for the District of Hawaii. He replaced Mark Hanohano.

Miyamoto is a graduate of President Theodore Roosevelt High School (1968), Chaminade University (Bachelor of General Studies in Criminal Justice Management, 1980), and the University of Phoenix (Master of Arts in Organizational Management, 2000).

References

United States Marshals
Chaminade University of Honolulu alumni
American people of Japanese descent
People from Hawaii
President Theodore Roosevelt High School alumni
University of Phoenix alumni
Living people
Year of birth missing (living people)